George Edward Marine  (5 January 1930 – 25 August 1998) was a major general in the United States Army. He served as deputy commander of Allied Land Forces Southern Europe.

References

1930 births
1998 deaths
People from Jacksonville, Illinois
Military personnel from Illinois
United States Army generals